The Mighty Barnum is a 1934 film starring Wallace Beery as P.T. Barnum.  The movie was written by Gene Fowler and Bess Meredyth, adapted from their play of the same name, and directed by Walter Lang.  Beery had played Barnum four years earlier in A Lady's Morals, a highly fictionalized biography of singer Jenny Lind.  The supporting cast features Adolphe Menjou, Virginia Bruce as Jenny Lind, and Rochelle Hudson.

Plot

Cast
Wallace Beery as P.T. Barnum
Adolphe Menjou as Bailey Walsh
Virginia Bruce as Jenny Lind
Rochelle Hudson as Ellen
Janet Beecher as Nancy Barnum
Tammany Young as Todd
Herman Bing as Farmer Schultz
Lucille La Verne as Joice Heath
George Brasno as Tom Thumb
Olive Brasno as Lavinia Thumb
May Boley as the Bearded Lady
John Hyams as J.P. Skiff
Ian Wolfe as Swedish Consul 
Davison Clark as Horace Greeley 
George MacQuarrie as Daniel Webster
Charles Judels as Maitre D'Hotel
Philo McCullough as Publicity Man (uncredited)
Frank Morgan as Joe (uncredited)
 Frances Raymond as Matron (uncredited)

References

External links

1934 films
American biographical films
Films directed by Walter Lang
Films produced by Darryl F. Zanuck
Films scored by Alfred Newman
Twentieth Century Pictures films
American black-and-white films
United Artists films
1930s biographical films
Films with screenplays by Bess Meredyth
Circus films
Cultural depictions of P. T. Barnum
Cultural depictions of Jenny Lind
1930s English-language films
1930s American films